Mumiola myrnae is a species of sea snail, a marine gastropod mollusk in the family Pyramidellidae.

Original description
Poppe G.T., Tagaro S.P. & Stahlschmidt P. (2015). New shelled molluscan species from the central Philippines I. Visaya. 4(3): 15-59.
page(s): 29, pl. 11 figs 1-2.

References

External links
 Worms Link

Pyramidellidae
Gastropods described in 2015